Ave Maria is a short film directed by Basil Khalil and written by him and Daniel Yáñez Khalil.

A family of religious Israeli settlers has their car break down in a rural area of the West Bank and they must seek the help of five nuns to get back home.

The movie was nominated for the Academy Award for Best Live Action Short Film at the 88th Academy Awards in 2016.

Cast 
Maria Zreik as Sr. Marie
Huda Al Imam as Sr. Marie Angeline
Shady Srour as Moshe
Ruth Farhi as Esther
 Maya Koren as Rachel 
Sana Tanous as Sr. Marie Antoinette
 Maria De Pina as Sr. Marie Josephine
Raneen Bisharat Iskandar as Sr. Marie of Christ Crucified

Awards and nominations

References

External links
 
 

2015 films
2015 comedy films
2015 short films
French comedy films
German comedy films
2010s French films
2010s German films